Nikos Kouzilos (Greek: Νίκος Κούζηλος, born in 1977 in the district of Manitica) is a Greek politician and a former member of the Greek Parliament for the Golden Dawn.

In 2014, he was also candidate for mayor in Piraeus.

References

External links
 

Year of birth missing (living people)
Living people
Golden Dawn (political party) politicians
Greek MPs 2012 (May)
Greek MPs 2012–2014
Greek MPs 2015 (February–August)
Greek MPs 2015–2019
Politicians from Piraeus